Methot is a surname. Notable people with the surname include:
 Marc Methot (born 1985), Canadian professional ice hockey defenceman
 Mayo Methot (1904–1951), American film and theater actress